The Australian PGA Seniors Championship is a golf tournament in Australia.

History 
The inaugural tournament was held in 1986. Legendary golfer Peter Thomson referred to the tournament as "a breakthrough" for Australian senior golf. The 1986 and 1987 events were played concurrently with the Rich River Classic, both being won by the American Orville Moody. The Rich River Classic was discontinued in 1988 because of a clash of dates, but Rich River continued to host the seniors championship until 1995. The 1988 championship was won by Jerry Stolhand. Stolhand, an American who had lived in Australia since 1969, was killed in a car accident in February 1989, shortly before the 1989 championship.

In 1996 the star American golfer Lee Trevino played the event. It was the first event he played in Australia in a decade. He played it as a gift to his friend Bruce Devlin who designed Gold Creek Country Club, the course the event was played on. He went on to win.

In recent years the event has been held at Richmond Golf Club. In late 2020 it was announced that the course got a two-year extension to host the tournament through 2022.

Winners 

Source:

References 

Golf tournaments in Australia
Recurring sporting events established in 1986
1986 establishments in Australia